Just 45 Minutes from Broadway is a 2012 American drama film written and directed by Henry Jaglom and starring Tanna Frederick and Judd Nelson.  It is based on Jaglom's 2009 play of the same name.

Cast
Tanna Frederick
Judd Nelson
Diane Salinger
Jack Heller
David Proval
Julie Davis
Harriet Schock
Michael Emil
Mary Crosby
Sabrina Jaglom
P.T. Townsend
Eliza Simon
Jack Quaid
Linda Carson
Emily Alexander

Release
The film was released at Laemmle Theatres in Los Angeles and Southern California on October 3, 2012.  It was later released in theaters in New York City on October 17, 2012.

Reception
The film has an 18% rating on Rotten Tomatoes.  Calum Marsh of Slant Magazine awarded the film half a star out of four.

References

External links
 
 

American drama films
2012 drama films
2012 films
American films based on plays
Films directed by Henry Jaglom
2010s English-language films
2010s American films